The Valiant Air Command, Inc. Warbird Museum (VAC) is located at the Space Coast Regional Airport in Brevard County, just south of Titusville, Florida. The VAC contains vintage aircraft and a  hangar with a restoration area. The VAC also has a Memorabilia Hall with flight gear, dress uniforms, weapons and artifacts. The collection includes fixed and rotary wing aircraft from World War I to the present. The flagship aircraft of the museum is a Douglas C-47 Skytrain called "TICO Belle" which returned to flying status in July 2009 after the aircraft was involved in an accident.

History
The museum began raising money as part of a four phase plan for expansion in 2021.

Following an accident a year prior, the museum was forced to sell its damaged TBM Avenger in March 2022.

Aircraft on display

Aircraft on display

 Beechcraft RU-21A Ute
 Beechcraft T-34C Turbo Mentor
 Bell H-13 Sioux
 Bell UH-1 Iroquois
 de Havilland DH.82A Tiger Moth
 English Electric Canberra TT.18
 Douglas TA-4J Skyhawk
 Douglas C-47A Skytrain – Airworthy
 Douglas SBD Dauntless
 Epps 1907 Monoplane – Replica
 Fokker Dr.I – Replica
 Fouga CM.170 Magister
 General Dynamics F-16A Fighting Falcon
 Grumman F-11F Tiger
 Grumman A-6 Intruder
 Grumman FM Wildcat
 Grumman F9F-5 Panther
 Grumman F-14A Tomcat
 Grumman OV-1C Mohawk
 Lockheed T-33
 Ling-Temco-Vought A-7A Corsair II
 McDonnell Douglas F-4J Phantom II
 McDonnell Douglas F/A-18 Hornet
 McDonnell F-101B Voodoo
 Mikoyan-Gurevich MiG-17
 Mikoyan-Gurevich MiG-21
 Nord Noralpha
 North American B-25 Mitchell
 North American F-86 Sabre
 North American F-100D Super Sabre
 North American T-2C Buckeye
 North American SNJ-5 Texan
 North American XP-82 Twin Mustang – On loan
 Piper L-4J Grasshopper
 Republic F-105 Thunderchief
 Sikorsky H-19 Chickasaw
 Northrop F-5E Shaped Sonic Boom Demonstration
 Sopwith Camel – Replica
 Stearman PT-17
 Stewart S-51D Mustang – 3/4 scale replica
 Stinson L-5 Sentinel
 Vought F-8K Crusader

Aircraft under restoration

Restoration to static display
 Cessna O-2 Skymaster
 McDonnell F-101 Voodoo
 Grumman F-11 Tiger - To be Displayed at California Science Center

Restoration to airworthy
 Grumman S-2F Tracker

See also
List of aerospace museums

References

Further reading

External links

 

Aerospace museums in Florida
Buildings and structures in Titusville, Florida
Military and war museums in Florida
Museums in Brevard County, Florida
Museums established in 1977
1977 establishments in Florida